Bermuda Grace is a 1994 American television film directed by Mark Sobel. A comedy thriller, it stars William Sadler and David Harewood as a Philadelphia and a British policemen who go on the hunt of a jewel thief to the Atlantic island of Bermuda. It was  also considered a backdoor pilot for potential series, however  the high production cost of an ongoing series in Bermuda made that impossible. It also featured Serena Scott Thomas, Andrew Jackson, Leslie Phillips and Cliff Parisi.  Written and produced by William Davies and William Osborne, writers of the feature film Twins.

References

External links

1994 films
American television films
Films set in Bermuda
Films shot in Bermuda
1990s English-language films
Films directed by Mark Sobel